Countess Catherine Opalińska (13 October 1680 – 19 March 1747), was by birth member of House of Opaliński, Queen consort of the Polish–Lithuanian Commonwealth twice and Duchess consort of Lorraine through her marriage with Stanisław I of Poland.

Biography
Catherine was the daughter of the magnate Count Jan Karol Opaliński and Zofia Czarnkowska. On May 10, 1698 in Kraków she married Stanisław Leszczyński, who became Duke of Lorraine and was, briefly, king of Poland (reigned as Stanisław I). In 1699, she gave birth to Anna Leszczyńska, and in 1703, to Marie Leszczyńska, the future spouse of Louis XV of France. Catherine suffered 20 miscarriages between 1700 and 1720.

Queen
In 1704, her spouse was elected King of Poland after having been supported as a candidate by Charles XII of Sweden, who had at the time placed Poland under his occupation. Between November 1704 and July 1705, Charles XII had his headquarters at Rawicz, and the royal couple held court at Rydzyna Castle nearby, where queen Catherine hosted balls and masquerades for the Swedish power holders and welcomed the wives of the Swedish commanders stationed there, such as for example Christina Piper, who visited Carl Piper in Ravicz and were introduced at the Polish court at the same time.

Exile
Queen Catherine was sent by Stanislaw through Gdansk to Stettin in 1708, when the political situation became unstable. In 1709, her spouse was deposed when the Swedish army lost the military upper hand in Poland, and the family was by Charles XII granted refuge in the Swedish city of Kristianstad in Scania, where they arrived in 1711 and stayed for three years. 

In Sweden, the family was welcomed by the Queen Dowager Hedwig Eleonora and became popular members of the society life on the estates of the nobility around Kristianstad: one of their acquaintances among the Swedish nobility were Christina Piper, whom they had met in Ravicz in 1705 and with whom they spent several months in Norrköping in the autumn of 1713. 
In 1712, they also visited Medevi, the spa of the Queen Dowager. In 1714, Charles XII gave them permission to live in the Swedish province of Zweibrücken in Germany, where they were supported by the income of Zweibrücken: they lived there until the death of Charles XII in 1718 Catherine, as well as her daughter queen Marie, maintained a political correspondence with Margareta Gyllenstierna, the spouse of Arvid Horn, with whom she had made the acquaintance during her stay in Sweden. 

After the death of Charles XII in 1718, they lived in Wissembourg in Alsace in France. Their lifestyle in Wissembourg was regarded as very below standard for a royal at that time; they lived in a small house, and could not pay the salary of their small retinue from which a few "served as an apology for a guard of honour", and the jewels of Catherine were reportedly held as security by a moneylender.

Catherine Opalińska was described at this point as economical but bitter, and her relationship with Stanislaw was reportedly not happy at this point as she felt disappointment over the loss of a royal position and her exile and blamed this on the actions of Stanislaw, in which she was joined by her mother-in-law Anna Leszczyńska (1660–1727), who lived with them in exile.

France
In 1725, her daughter Marie was chosen to be the queen of France, which made Catherine mother-in-law to Louis XV of France. After the wedding, Catherine and Stanisław resided at the Château de Chambord. They kept their titles and were addressed and treated at the French court as king and queen. 

In 1733, Stanislaw again took the throne of Poland during the War of the Polish Succession, making her queen of Poland for the second time. He abdicated the throne in 1736, however. Catherine remained in exile in France during his second reign in Poland. 

In 1737, her spouse was granted the Duchy of Lorraine for life, and settled there as Duke of Lorraine. This made Catherine duchess consort of Lorraine, and she joined him there and settled at the Ducal court in Nancy. Until her death, however, she kept her title of Queen.  Catherine suffered from asthma and heart problems, which served as a reason for not attending ceremonial functions, and she was described as a bigot occupied with her "obsession" of returning to Poland.  

As long as she lived, Stanisław reportedly benefited the Catholic church and the Jesuit order financially.    In contrast to Stanisław, Catherine did not adjust to life in France or Lorraine, but felt a certain bitterness over her exile, and continued to long for Poland. Catherine Opalinska was described as homely, pious and charitable, but also as a "dour" personality whom Stanisław regarded to be boring. As soon as they were installed with their court in Lorraine, Stanisław took numerous mistresses, many among her ladies-in-waiting, such as Catherine Ossolińska and Anna Maria Ossolińska, the Première dame d'honneur Marie-Louise de Linanges, Madame de Bassompierre and Madame de Cambres, until from 1745 he had a permanent relationship with Marie Françoise Catherine de Beauvau-Craon, all relationships which Catherine could not prevent.

Death
When his mother-in-law, the spouse of the dethroned king of Poland, died in 1747, Louis XV ordered a commemorative ceremony, in her honour at Notre Dame Cathedral in Paris. The ceremony glorified the deceased who underwent a veritable deification.

Her tomb is in the church of Notre-Dame-de-Bonsecours, in Nancy, next to her husband and the heart of their daughter. Rue Catherine Opalinska in Nancy is named after her.

Gallery

Ancestors

See also

 History of Poland (1569–1795)
 Sieraków
 Nancy

References

This article is based on a translation of the equivalent article of the French Wikipedia on 7 March 2007
 Renata Tyszczuk: The Story of an Architect King: Stanislas Leszczynski in Lorraine 1737-1766

Further reading
 Zieliński, Ryszard (1978). Polka na francuskim tronie. Czytelnik.

1680 births
1747 deaths
Catherine
Poniatowski family
People from Poznań
Polish queens consort
Grand Duchesses of Lithuania
Prussian royal consorts
Catherine
Polish royalty
18th-century Polish nobility